There are two different notable automobile magazines titled Sport auto, therefore this may refer to:

Sport auto (France)
sport auto (Germany)